1911 in sports describes the year's events in world sport.

American football
College championship
 College football national championship – Princeton Tigers
Events
 25 November — the tradition of homecoming begins at the 1911 Kansas vs. Missouri football game.

Association football

Cyprus
 Anorthosis Famagusta FC founded (30 January)
Egypt
 Zamalek SC is founded at Gezira Island, Cairo as "Thakanat Qasr El-Nil Club" (5 January)
England
 The Football League – Manchester United 52 points, Aston Villa 51, Sunderland 45, Everton 45, Bradford City 45, The Wednesday 42
 FA Cup final – Bradford City 1–0 Newcastle United at Old Trafford, Manchester (replay following 0–0 draw at Crystal Palace)
Germany
 National Championship – Viktoria Berlin 3–1 VfB Leipzig at Dresden 
Scotland
 Scottish Football League – Rangers
 Scottish Cup – Celtic 2–0 Hamilton Academical at Ibrox Park

Australian rules football
VFL Premiership
 Essendon wins the 15th VFL Premiership: Essendon 5.11 (41) d Collingwood 4.11 (35) at Melbourne Cricket Ground (MCG)

Bandy
Sweden
 Championship final – IFK Uppsala 6–0 Djurgårdens IF

Baseball
World Series
 14–26 October — Philadelphia Athletics (AL) defeats New York Giants (NL) to win the 1911 World Series by 4 games to 2
Events
 Chalmers Award – Frank Schulte, NL; Ty Cobb, AL

Boxing
Events
 Monte Attell loses his World Bantamweight Championship to Frankie Conley, but Conley holds the title a matter of days before losing to Johnny Coulon
Lineal world champions
 World Heavyweight Championship – Jack Johnson
 World Light Heavyweight Championship – vacant
 World Middleweight Championship – vacant
 World Welterweight Championship – vacant
 World Lightweight Championship – Ad Wolgast
 World Featherweight Championship – Abe Attell 
 World Bantamweight Championship – Monte Attell → Frankie Conley → Johnny Coulon

Canadian football
Grey Cup
 25 November — 3rd Grey Cup – University of Toronto Varsity Blues 14–7 Toronto Argonauts

Cricket
Events
 Warwickshire wins its first-ever County Championship title, the first of the competition's "new clubs" to do so
England
 County Championship – Warwickshire
 Minor Counties Championship – Staffordshire
 Most runs – Phil Mead 2562 @ 54.51 (HS 223)
 Most wickets – Harry Dean 183 @ 17.43 (BB 9–109)
 Wisden Cricketers of the Year – Frank Foster, J W Hearne, Sep Kinneir, Phil Mead, Herbert Strudwick
Australia
 Sheffield Shield – New South Wales
 Most runs – Aubrey Faulkner 1534 @ 59.00 (HS 204)
 Most wickets – Bill Whitty 70 @ 20.27 (BB 6–17) 
India
 Bombay Triangular – Europeans shared with Hindus
New Zealand
 Plunket Shield – Canterbury
South Africa
 Currie Cup – Griqualand West
West Indies
 Inter-Colonial Tournament – Barbados

Cycling
Tour de France
 Gustave Garrigou (France) wins the 9th Tour de France

Figure skating
World Figure Skating Championships
 World Men's Champion – Ulrich Salchow (Sweden)
 World Women's Champion – Lily Kronberger (Hungary)
 World Pairs Champions – Ludowika Jakobsson-Eilers / Walter Jakobsson (Finland)

Golf
Events
 John McDermott becomes both the first American-born man and the youngest golfer (19 years, 10 months) to win the US Open
Major tournaments
 British Open – Harry Vardon
 US Open – John McDermott
Other tournaments
 British Amateur – Harold Hilton
 US Amateur – Harold Hilton

Horse racing
England
 Grand National – Glenside
 1,000 Guineas Stakes – Atmah
 2,000 Guineas Stakes – Sunstar
 The Derby – Sunstar
 The Oaks – Cherimoya
 St. Leger Stakes – Prince Palatine
Australia
 Melbourne Cup – The Parisian
Canada
 King's Plate – St. Bass
Ireland
 Irish Grand National – Reparator II
 Irish Derby Stakes – Shanballymore
USA
 Kentucky Derby – Meridian 
 Preakness Stakes – Watervale
 Belmont Stakes – not contested due to anti-betting legislation in New York State

Ice hockey
Stanley Cup
 March — Ottawa Hockey Club wins the National Hockey Association (NHA) championship and Stanley Cup 
 16 March — Ottawa forward Marty Walsh scores 10 goals in a 13–4 win over Port Arthur Seniors in a Stanley Cup challenge.  His tally is second in Stanley Cup history to Frank McGee's 14-goal total on 16 January 1905.
Events
 March — Winnipeg Victorias wins the Allan Cup
 13 November — NHA founding team Renfrew Creamery Kings drops out of the league and the players under contract are dispersed to other teams. Two franchises are sold to Toronto interests who intend to start in the 1911–12 season, but Toronto's new Arena Gardens is not ready for play.
 7 December — upon completion of artificial ice rinks in Vancouver and Victoria, British Columbia, the new professional Pacific Coast Hockey Association (PCHA) league is created by former NHA players Frank and Lester Patrick. A bidding war for players ensues with numerous NHA players leaving to play in the PCHA.

Motorsport

Rowing
The Boat Race
 1 April — Oxford wins the 68th Oxford and Cambridge Boat Race

Rugby league
England
 Championship – Oldham
 Challenge Cup final – Broughton Rangers 4–0 Wigan at The Willows, Salford 
 Lancashire League Championship – Wigan
 Yorkshire League Championship – Wakefield Trinity
 Lancashire County Cup – Oldham 4–3 Swinton
 Yorkshire County Cup – Wakefield Trinity 8–2 Huddersfield
Australia
 NSW Premiership – Eastern Suburbs 11–8 Glebe (grand final)

Rugby union
Five Nations Championship
 29th Five Nations Championship series is won by Wales who complete the inaugural Grand Slam by defeating all four of its opponents

Speed skating
Speed Skating World Championships
 Men's All-round Champion – Nikolay Strunnikov (Russia)

Tennis
Australia
 Australian Men's Singles Championship – Norman Brookes (Australia) defeats Horace Rice (Australia) 6–1 6–2 6–3
England
 Wimbledon Men's Singles Championship – Anthony Wilding (New Zealand) defeats Herbert Barrett (GB) 6–4 4–6 2–6 6–2 retired
 Wimbledon Women's Singles Championship – Dorothea Douglass Lambert Chambers (GB) defeats Dora Boothby (GB) 6–0 6–0 
France
 French Men's Singles Championship – André Gobert (France) defeats Maurice Germot (France): details unknown
 French Women's Singles Championship – Jeanne Matthey defeats Marguerite Broquedis (France) (France): details unknown
USA
 American Men's Singles Championship – William Larned (USA) defeats Maurice McLoughlin (USA) 6–4 6–4 6–2
 American Women's Singles Championship – Hazel Hotchkiss Wightman (USA) defeats Florence Sutton (USA) 8–10 6–1 9–7
Davis Cup
 1911 International Lawn Tennis Challenge –  4–0  at Hagley Park (grass) Christchurch, New Zealand

References

 
Sports by year